The bicameral Parliament is the legislative body of the Central African Republic. It consists of the National Assembly and the Senate.

The Senate has not yet been created.

References

 
Government of the Central African Republic
Politics of the Central African Republic
Political organisations based in the Central African Republic
Central African Republic
Central African Republic
Central African Republic